Dermot Patrick Martin Dunne is the current and, by some counts, 35th Dean of Christ Church Cathedral, Dublin.

Early life and education
A native of Mallow, Dean Dunne was born in 1959 and educated in philosophy and theology at St Patrick's College Maynooth, was ordained a deacon in 1983 and a priest in 1984, serving his early priestly ministry in the Roman Catholic Diocese of Cloyne, Fr. Dunne taught Religion in CBS Charleville.  Later he was appointed chaplain to the Whittington Hospital in London and worked in two parishes there including St. George's Cathedral, Southwark and while in London, the Dean pursued graduate and post-graduate studies in psychotherapy and qualified as a psychotherapist in 1995. While studying psychotherapy at the Chiron Centre he met his wife Celia, and he left the ministry, and they married in a Church of England ceremony in 1996. After studying at the Church of Ireland Theological Institute he was licensed by the Church of Ireland priest in 1998.

Church of Ireland ministry
In 1999 he became the Dean's Vicar of Christ Church Cathedral, Dublin. Having served his title there until 2001, Dean Dunne was appointed incumbent of the Crosspatrick and Carnew Group of parishes in county Wicklow. During his incumbency he was appointed Precentor of Ferns and subsequently Archdeacon of Ferns before his appointment as Dean of Christ Church Cathedral Dublin in 2008. Dean Dunne earned a BA from DCU in 2004 and completed an MA in Applied  Spirituality at All Hallows College and was awarded his master's degree from Dublin City University. He is married to Celia Dunne (née' Burl.)

Notes

1959 births
Living people
People from Mallow, County Cork
Alumni of St Patrick's College, Maynooth
Alumni of the Church of Ireland Theological Institute
Alumni of All Hallows College, Dublin
Alumni of Dublin City University
Converts to Anglicanism from Roman Catholicism
Deans of Christ Church Cathedral, Dublin
Archdeacons of Ferns